Cochlearia tatrae, the Tatra scurvy-grass, is a flowering plant of the genus Cochlearia in the family Brassicaceae. The plant is endemic to and named after the Tatra Mountains, which in northern Slovakia and southern Poland.

The plant blooms from April to September.

Distribution
The species is a subnival (upper alpine dwarf scrub) and alpine plant. It is found in moist rock scree and crevices, and around springs and streams.

The population is estimated at 600 individuals. It is found on Mięguszowiecki Szczyt Mountain (Slovak: Veľký Mengusovský štít), which is on the Slovak-Polish border.

Cochlearia tatrae is an IUCN Red List vulnerable species.

References

External links

tatrae
Alpine flora
Flora of Poland
Flora of Slovakia
Tatra Mountains
Vulnerable plants
Flora of the Carpathians